The 2018 FC Zhetysu season is the club's first season back in the Kazakhstan Premier League following their relegation at the end of the 2016 season, and 21st season in total

Squad

Transfers

Winter

In:

Out:

Summer

In:

Out:

Competitions

Premier League

Results summary

Results by round

Results

League table

Kazakhstan Cup

Squad statistics

Appearances and goals

|-
|colspan="14"|Players away from Zhetysu on loan:
|-
|colspan="14"|Players who left Zhetysu during the season:

|}

Goal scorers

Disciplinary record

References

FC Zhetysu seasons
Zhetysu